Giorgio Barbolini (30 April 1934 – 18 June 2022) was an Italian professional footballer who played as a midfielder.

He was born in Modena. He played four seasons (84 games, 5 goals) in the Serie A for A.S. Roma and Calcio Padova. In his season with Inter Milan he only played in Coppa Italia, scoring once.

His younger brothers Gianni Barbolini and Ermanno Barbolini also played football professionally. To distinguish them, Giorgio was referred to as Barbolini I, Gianni as Barbolini II and Ermanno as Barbolini III.

Barbolini died on 18 June 2022, at the age 88.

References

External links
Profile at Almanaccogiallorosso.it

1934 births
2022 deaths
Italian footballers
Association football midfielders
Serie A players
Serie B players
Modena F.C. players
A.C. Reggiana 1919 players
A.S. Roma players
Inter Milan players
Calcio Padova players
Modena F.C. managers
Sportspeople from Modena